Barykino-Klyuchi is a rural locality (a selo) in Tarbagataysky District, Republic of Buryatia, Russia. The population was 162 as of 2010. There are 2 streets.

Geography 
Barykino-Klyuchi is located 35 km southwest of Tarbagatay (the district's administrative centre) by road. Khandagatay is the nearest rural locality.

References 

Rural localities in Tarbagataysky District